James Brolin (born Craig Kenneth Bruderlin; July 18, 1940) is an American actor. Brolin has won two Golden Globes and an Emmy. He received a star on the Hollywood Walk of Fame on August 27, 1998. He is the father of actor Josh Brolin. 

He is best known for his TV roles such as Steven Kiley on Marcus Welby, M.D.(1969–1976), Peter McDermott on Hotel (1983–1988), and John Short in Life in Pieces (2015–2019), and his film roles such as Sgt. Jerome K. Weber in Skyjacked (1972), John Blane in Westworld (1973), General Ralph Landry in Traffic (2000), Jack Barnes in  Catch Me If You Can (2002) and Emperor Zurg in the 2022 Toy Story spin-off film Lightyear.

Early life
Brolin was born Craig Kenneth Bruderlin in Westwood Village, Los Angeles, California. The eldest of two brothers and two sisters, he is the son of Helen Sue (née Mansur) (1915-2014), a housewife, and Henry Hurst Bruderlin (1911–2002), a building contractor. As a young child, he was interested in animals and in model airplanes, which he began building and flying when he was 10. As a teenaged filmgoer in the mid-1950s, he was particularly fascinated with actor James Dean, and he began shooting 8 mm films. When his parents invited a director over to his family's house for dinner before auditioning, he met another fellow actor and classmate, Ryan O'Neal, who was about a year younger than Brolin. The two clicked and later enrolled in University High School located in West Los Angeles. However, Brolin's own acting exposed his stifling shyness. His assurance grew when O'Neal invited him to a casting agency. Brolin graduated from high school in 1958, and his family was already encouraging him to become an actor like O'Neal.

 Career 

Early career
Brolin attended Santa Monica City College and studied drama at the University of California Los Angeles before signing a contract with 20th Century Fox in 1960. At Fox, he started out as a contract player in Sandra Dee movies. Brolin appeared on an episode of Bus Stop in 1961. The part led to parts in other television productions such as Voyage to the Bottom of the Sea; Margie; Love, American Style; Twelve O'Clock High; and The Long, Hot Summer. He made three guest appearances on the popular 1960s series Batman, alongside Adam West and Burt Ward,  as well as roles in The Virginian, and Owen Marshall: Counselor at Law alongside Arthur Hill and Lee Majors. He also had a recurring role on the short-lived television series The Monroes.

At age 20, he changed his surname from "Bruderlin" to "Brolin" to become James Brolin ("Bruder" is the German word for "brother"). While in school struggling to make it big, he met actor Clint Eastwood. Brolin also had small roles in several films including Take Her, She's Mine (1963), Dear Brigitte (1965), Von Ryan's Express (1965), and Fantastic Voyage (1966). The following year, his first big role was in The Cape Town Affair (1967), but it did not receive any success at the box office. Brolin was ultimately fired by 20th Century Fox.
In 1969 he co-starred in the TV series Marcus Welby, M.D., portraying a doctor.

Film
During the 1970s, the  Brolin began appearing in leading roles in films, including Skyjacked (1972) and Westworld (1973). By the mid-1970s, he was a regular leading man in films, starring in Gable and Lombard (1976), The Car (1977), Capricorn One (1978, in which he costarred with Elliott Gould, Streisand's ex-husband), The Amityville Horror (1979), Night of the Juggler (1980), and High Risk (1981). When Roger Moore expressed his desire to vacate the role of James Bond, Brolin undertook screen tests to replace him in Octopussy (1983). It has been reported that not only were these successful, but Brolin was actually on the point of moving to London to begin work on the film when the producers persuaded Moore to continue.

In 1985, Brolin parodied his near-hiring as James Bond in the film Pee-Wee's Big Adventure. In a film within the film, he merged the characters of Bond and Pee-Wee Herman, the "real" version of whom was played by Paul Reubens. He is referred to as "PW" and the role of Pee-Wee Herman's girlfriend "Dottie" is played by Morgan Fairchild.

Television
 

While contracted to Fox, Brolin had three small roles on the television series "Batman," in the episodes "The Cat and the Fiddle", "The Catwoman Goeth", and "Ring Around the Riddler". 

In 1968, Brolin transferred to Universal Studios, where he auditioned for a co-starring role opposite seasoned actor Robert Young in the popular medical drama Marcus Welby, M.D. (1969–1976). The series was one of the top-rated television shows of the day. Brolin became widely known for his portrayal of youthful, skilled assistant physician Dr. Steven Kiley. The chemistry between Young & Brolin clicked, and even came to attract young women for its medical interest throughout the show's run. In its first season in 1970, Brolin won the Emmy Award for Outstanding Performance by an Actor in a Supporting Role, and was subsequently nominated three more times. He was also nominated for Golden Globes three times for Best Supporting Actor, and won twice between 1971 and 1973. Brolin also starred in the television films Short Walk to Daylight (1972) and Trapped (1973). He and his first wife Jane also appeared on several episodes of the 1970s game show Tattletales.

In 1983, Brolin returned to television to star in another series and teamed with producer Aaron Spelling's prime-time soap opera, Hotel, for ABC. On Hotel Brolin played Peter McDermott, a hotel manager.

For Hotel Brolin was nominated twice for Golden Globes between 1983 and 1984 for Best Performance By an Actor in a TV Series, but did not win either time. He would eventually serve as a director on the show, as well. On one episode of Hotel, he invited his future wife Jan Smithers to guest-star on the show as the writers suggested that they develop a storyline for them, as Brolin was going through a difficult divorce at the time. By 1988, after 5 seasons, Hotel was about to close its doors for good and the show was cancelled. That same year, his co-star, Nathan Cook had died of an allergic reaction to penicillin, and Brolin along with the rest of his cast attended his funeral.

Actress Connie Sellecca said of Brolin's on-screen chemistry with her on Hotel, "I remember instantly feeling comfortable with Jim, and that's the thing that Jim has as to women, most women, they need to feel safe, and Jim gets that." She also said, "To have him in a different role and have that confidence, it was a wonderful experience." After the show's cancellation, Sellecca continues to be good friends with Brolin. In 1992, her mentor was in attendance at her wedding to John Tesh.

As the new decade approached, Brolin starred in both Angel Falls for CBS and Extreme for ABC, although neither matched the popularity of his earlier series.

In 1997, Brolin's luck changed with the syndicated television series Pensacola: Wings of Gold. He played the role of Lt. Col. Bill "Raven" Kelly, whose job was to teach young Marines in a special unit, before being promoted to work with a group of talented Marine fighter pilots. Brolin served as an executive producer and director on the series. In 2000, however, the show was cancelled after 66 episodes due to low ratings.

In 1997, he also hosted Beyond Belief: Fact or Fiction, a television series that shows five stories which have to do with the paranormal and supernatural. Jonathan Frakes took his place after the first season of the show.

In 1997, Brolin guest-starred on Roseanne. In Part 1 ("Lanford's Elite"), Roseanne & Jackie go to a luncheon at the Lanford Country Club, where they meet the son of their old boss Edgar Wellman Jr. (Brolin) of the Wellman Plastics factory. It appears that the factory is in need of financial help and Roseanne's money could save the factory. In Part 2 ("Some Enchanted Merger"), once the Wellman Plastics buyout is completed, Roseanne is at a loss for what to do when a mutual attraction springs between herself and Wellman.

Since 2000
Brolin has had a number of supporting roles in major cinema releases since 2000. These include (amongst others) the role of General Ralph Landry, outgoing director of the Office of National Drug Control Policy in Steven Soderbergh's Oscar-winning Traffic (2000); as Jack Barnes in Steven Spielberg's Catch Me If You Can (2002); a minor role in the 2003 comedy A Guy Thing; as philandering husband Robert Hatch in the 2006 comedy The Alibi (released in the UK as Lies and Alibis); as Jack Jennings in the 2007 film The American Standards; as TV network anchor Frank Harris in Richard Shepard's The Hunting Party (2007); and as Brian in Joel Hopkins' 2008 film Last Chance Harvey with Emma Thompson and Dustin Hoffman.

In 2002, Brolin played Governor Robert Ritchie of Florida, the Republican opponent of President Jed Bartlet, on the TV series The West Wing.

In late 2003, Brolin portrayed Ronald Reagan in the television film The Reagans. The film was originally meant to air on CBS, but after creative differences, scripts controversies, and rising costs, CBS passed on the film, and it aired on cable channel Showtime, also owned by Viacom. The role earned Brolin his fifth Emmy Award nomination, as well as his fifth Golden Globe nomination.

In 2005, Brolin guest starred on the TV series Monk as casino owner Daniel Thorn. In 2006, Brolin appeared in the A&E Network film Wedding Wars, playing an anti-gay marriage governor. In 2008, Brolin guest starred on Law & Order: SVU as astronaut Col. Dick Finley. The same year, Brolin also starred in the lead role in the Sci-Fi Channel film Lost City Raiders.

Brolin appeared in the 2009 comedy film The Goods: Live Hard, Sell Hard.

He also appeared in a 2009 episode of Psych, titled "High Noon-ish", in which he played the sheriff of a tourist-attracting "Wild West" town. The episode was in part a parody of the 1973 film Westworld, in which he had starred.

Brolin has played Richard Castle's mysterious father in two episodes of ABC's Castle, in 2013 and 2014. He appeared in the NBC sitcom Community as William Winger, Jeff Winger's estranged father.

From 2015 until 2019, he played the role of John, the family patriarch, in the CBS comedy Life in Pieces.

In his first voice acting role, Brolin portrayed Emperor Zurg in the 2022 Toy Story spin-off film Lightyear.

Personal life

Brolin has been married three times and has three children.

In 1966, he married Jane Cameron Agee, a wildlife activist and aspiring actress at Twentieth Century Fox, 12 days after they first met. The couple had two children, Josh (b. 1968), and Jess (b. 1972). They were divorced in 1984. Jane died in a car accident on February 13, 1995, one day after their son's 27th birthday. Josh said on the October 14, 2008, episode of the Late Show with David Letterman that his parents met on the TV series Batman, where his mother was assistant casting director. James Brolin is the grandfather of Trevor (b. 1988) and Eden (b. 1994), from Josh's first marriage, as well as Westlyn (b. 2018) and Chapel (b. 2020) from Josh's third marriage. 

In the late 1970s, Brolin started a brief but relatively successful career in sports car racing. After success in several celebrity auto races, he entered the 1979 24 Hours Nürburgring as part of the AMC Spirit team. Brolin's two-car team, which included accomplished racer Lyn St. James, finished both 1st and 2nd in class. 

In 1985, Brolin met actress Jan Smithers on the set of Hotel'', and they married in 1986.  The couple had a daughter, Molly Elizabeth (b. 1987). Jan Smithers filed for divorce from Brolin in 1995.

In 1996, Brolin met Barbra Streisand through a friend, and they married on July 1, 1998. The couple reside in Malibu, California. Brolin is the stepfather of Streisand's only child, Jason Gould.

Filmography

Film

Television

References

External links

 
 
 

1940 births
Living people
University High School (Los Angeles) alumni
American male film actors
American male soap opera actors
American male television actors
American television directors
California Democrats
Outstanding Performance by a Supporting Actor in a Drama Series Primetime Emmy Award winners
Outstanding Performance by a Cast in a Motion Picture Screen Actors Guild Award winners
Male actors from Los Angeles
Best Supporting Actor Golden Globe (television) winners
20th-century American male actors
21st-century American male actors
20th Century Studios contract players
People from Westwood, Los Angeles